Hautecourt-Romanèche is a commune in the Ain department in eastern France.

The commune comprises many villages and hamlets including: Challes, Chambod, Hautecourt, Merlot, Perroi, Romaneche, Soiriat and Villette.

Population

Sights
The commune's biggest tourist attraction is the Island of Chambod which also has a camp site. There is also the Donjon de Buenc which used to be an outpost along the Savoy frontier. The village of Hautecourt is also home to a rare type of cave which is only accessed once every seven years so as not to disturb the many species that are indigenous to it.

Sports
The commune also has a football team who regularly play in Hautecourt in their home colours of purple.

See also
Communes of the Ain department

References

Communes of Ain
Ain communes articles needing translation from French Wikipedia